Alma is an unincorporated community in Clarke County, Alabama, United States.  The community was named for Alma Flinn, a local teacher.

Geography

Demographics
According to the returns from 1850-2010 for Alabama, it has never reported a population figure separately on the U.S. Census.

References

Unincorporated communities in Alabama
Unincorporated communities in Clarke County, Alabama